Scholes is a village near Cleckheaton, West Yorkshire, England.

The village was originally known as "Scales" and was a hamlet in the township of Cleckheaton. In the 18th century the most prominent industry in the village was "card making" (combing cotton or linen.). Later on a Coal mine opened in the area but that closed early in the 20th century.

Other Scholes in West Yorkshire
There are two other villages and a hamlet in West Yorkshire known as "Scholes". One village is near Holmfirth, the other is near Leeds and a hamlet near Oakworth, near Keighley. For others see Scholes.

See also
Listed buildings in Cleckheaton

External links

 Pictures of Scholes - Scholes family website.

Heavy Woollen District
Cleckheaton
Villages in West Yorkshire